Barry York Tubb (born February 13, 1963) is an American actor and director.  He has worked in both television and film between 1983 and 2014.

Early life
Tubb was born in Snyder, Texas, in 1963. He won the state bull-riding championship at age 15 (junior division). After graduating from Snyder High School in 1981, he began stage training in San Francisco. Tubb moved to Hollywood in the mid '80s to begin his screen- and television-acting career.

Career
He earned a regular role on the short-lived baseball ensemble series Bay City Blues and later a recurring role as a rookie police officer on Hill Street Blues.  He played a shy homosexual boy who comes out to his parents in Consenting Adult, and a wealthy corporate upstart involved in murder in Billionaire Boys Club. Barry's most popular television role was that of Jasper Fant in the epic Westerns Lonesome Dove and its sequel Return to Lonesome Dove in 1993, which were partly set in his native Texas.

Moving on to film, Barry accepted supporting roles in Mask, The Legend of Billie Jean, and as Wolfman in Top Gun. In 1988, he co-starred with Mary Tyler Moore and Lynn Redgrave in the Broadway production of Sweet Sue, in which he appeared nude, and which had a run of 164 performances. The following year, he appeared in the drama Warm Summer Rain opposite Kelly Lynch.  Barry turned to independent filming and other interests outside of Hollywood. In 1991, he moved to France and rode in a Wild West show. Barry starred, directed, produced, and co-wrote the Cowboys and Indians low-budget thriller Blood Trail which led to no major offers for distribution.

In 2002, Tubb directed the family film Grand Champion about the exploits a young boy who raises a prize-winning steer and struggles to save it from the slaughterhouse. He shot the film in his own hometown of Snyder, Texas.

Tubb has participated in gatherings of the American Cowboy Culture Association, which holds the annual National Cowboy Symposium and Celebration each September in Lubbock, Texas.

Filmography

References

External links
 
 Interview Snyder's Little Piece of Hollywood: Barry Tubb

1963 births
Living people
American male film actors
American male television actors
People from Snyder, Texas
Male actors from Texas
20th-century American male actors
21st-century American male actors
Film directors from Texas